Billmasonius is a genus of braconid wasps in the family Braconidae. There is at least one described species in Billmasonius, B. cienci, found in Thailand.

References

Microgastrinae